Joel Bialys Michaels is a film producer and actor. His notable work includes The Changeling for which he won a Best Motion Picture and a Golden Reel Award.

His other work includes Basic Instinct 2, Terminator 3: Rise of the Machines, Terminator Salvation, Lolita, Stargate, Universal Soldier and The Philadelphia Experiment.

Filmography
He was a producer in all films unless otherwise noted.

Film

Production manager

As writer

Television

External links
 
 Filmbug.com biography

Canadian Screen Award winners
Year of birth missing (living people)
Living people
Place of birth missing (living people)
Canadian film producers